Disphragis tricolor is a moth of the family Notodontidae first described by Herbert Druce in 1911. It is found in the western Andes of Colombia and Ecuador.

References

Moths described in 1911
Notodontidae